Ignacio Téllez González (born 5 December 1968) is a Mexican politician from the National Action Party. From 2009 to 2012 he served as Deputy of the LXI Legislature of the Mexican Congress representing Jalisco, and previously served as the municipal president of Etzatlán from 2007 to 2009.

References

1968 births
Living people
People from Mexicali
National Action Party (Mexico) politicians
21st-century Mexican politicians
Politicians from Baja California
Municipal presidents in Jalisco
Deputies of the LXI Legislature of Mexico
Members of the Chamber of Deputies (Mexico) for Jalisco